Vincenzo Zucconelli (born 3 June 1931) was a road racing cyclist from Italy who won the silver medal in the men's team road race, alongside Dino Bruni and Gianni Ghidini. Italy's fourth rider Bruno Monti also crossed the line, but did not receive a medal because just the first three counted for the final classification. He was a professional rider from 1954 to 1959.

References

External links
 

1931 births
Living people
Italian male cyclists
Cyclists at the 1952 Summer Olympics
Olympic cyclists of Italy
Olympic silver medalists for Italy
Sportspeople from the Province of Ferrara
Olympic medalists in cycling
Cyclists from Emilia-Romagna
Medalists at the 1952 Summer Olympics